Allied Land Forces Southern Europe (LANDSOUTH) was a military command of NATO's Allied Forces Southern Europe (AFSOUTH) command. Based in Verona in Northern Italy LANDSOUTH was tasked with defending Italy north of the Apennine mountains against a Warsaw Pact or Yugoslavian invasion. Activated in 1951 under an Italian Army four-star general, the command was disbanded in 2004.

Commander, Allied Land Forces Southern Europe was a NATO Principal Subordinate Commander.

History 
Following the creation of NATO in 1949, the Italian military was integrated into NATO's Allied Forces Southern Europe (AFSOUTH) and prepared for a feared Soviet invasion from the east, possibly via Yugoslavia. Allied Land Forces Southern Europe (LANDSOUTH), was activated on 10 July 1951 to defend northeastern Italy and headquartered in the Carli Palace in Verona.  Three infantry divisions and three brigades were the only forces initially available to this command to defend Northern Italy. The divisions in question were the Mantova Infantry Division in Udine, the  Folgore Motorized Infantry Division in Treviso, the Trieste Motorized Infantry Division in Bologna. Two of the three brigades were Alpini mountain infantry brigades – the Julia Alpine Brigade in Cividale del Friuli and Tridentina Alpine Brigade in Brixen, while the third brigade was the Ariete Armoured Brigade in Pordenone.

From the mid-1950s the Portuguese Division "Nun´Álvares" was earmarked to reinforce the Italian forces in time of war.

The commanding general of LANDSOUTH was an Italian Generale di Corpo d'Armata, equal to a US Army four-star general, with an Italian two star general as Chief of Staff, an Italian one star general as head of operations and a US Army one star general as head of logistic support. LANDSOUTH was under the command of AFSOUTH in Naples and supported by the Allied Air Forces Southern Europe's (AIRSOUTH) Fifth Allied Tactical Air Force (5 ATAF) in Vicenza.

On 17 December 1981 in Verona, two members of the Italian terrorist organization the Red Brigades disguised themselves as plumbers to gain entry into the apartment of Brigadier General James L. Dozier, the then senior U.S. Army officer, and Deputy Chief of Staff of LANDSOUTH. Over the prior seven years, no hostages of the Red Brigades had been found alive. Ten days after the kidnapping, the Red Brigades released a photo of Dozier with a swollen left eye sitting in front of a banner with the Italian group's emblem, denouncing the general as an "assassin and hero of the American massacres in Vietnam" and announcing the start of his "proletarian trial." Dozier was rescued by NOCS, an Italian special force, with assistance from the Intelligence Support Activity's Operation Winter Harvest, after 42 days of captivity.

On 1 September 1999 LANDSOUTH was redesignated Joint Command South and took responsibility for a larger territory. Anticipating this step Italy had already created its own national command to replace LANDSOUTH: Operational Land Forces Command (COMFOTER) was activated on 1 October 1997 and took control of the Italian combat, combat support and signals formations. On 1 October 2004 Joint Command South was disbanded and its function absorbed by Allied Force Command Madrid.

Bunkers  
In case of war with the Warsaw Pact LANDSOUTH would have moved to the "West Star" (Site A) bunker complex in Affi. Built between 1960 and 1966 West Star could support up to 500 people for 15 days without need for external supplies. In addition to LANDSOUTH, the command staff of 5ATAF would operate from West Star. An additional bunker "Back Yard" (Site B) was built between 1960 and 1966 in the village of Grezzana to serve as secondary or backup bunker should West Star be destroyed.  Additionally in Soave a communications bunker was built (Site C), whose backup bunker was in Cavaion Veronese.

Structure 

During the Cold War LANDSOUTH commanded the following Italian formations and units:

 Allied Land Forces Southern Europe
 3rd Army Corps
 4th Alpine Army Corps
 5th Army Corps
 Anti-aircraft Artillery Command, in Padua
 Military Region North-East, for the logistical support
 Psychological Operations Battalion "Monte Grappa"
 Mixed Signal Support Group (an air force and army mixed unit for communication with 5 ATAF)
 US Army 3rd Battalion, 325th Airborne Infantry Regiment in Vicenza

All allied land reinforcements arriving in Northern Italy would have come under LANDSOUTH's command. In 1989 allied forces earmarked  to reinforce LANDSOUTH included a Spanish Army corps of two divisions, either armored/mechanized or mountain divisions as operationally required; and the 1st Independent Mixed Brigade from the Portuguese Army.

References 

Formations of the NATO Military Command Structure 1952–1994
Military units and formations established in 1951
Military units and formations disestablished in 2004
1951 establishments in Italy